Barbara Dallas Creecy (born 17 June 1958) is a South African politician and previous anti-apartheid activist. A member of the African National Congress, she is currently serving as Minister of Environment, Forestry and Fisheries, and as a Member of the National Assembly of South Africa. She previously served as a Member of the Gauteng Provincial Legislature, having been elected in 1994. In 2004, she was named Gauteng MEC for Sports, Recreation, Arts and Culture. She served until 2009 when she was appointed MEC for Education. Newly elected premier David Makhura moved Creecy to the Gauteng Finance portfolio in 2014.

In May 2019, Creecy was sworn in as a Member of Parliament. On 29 May 2019, President Cyril Ramaphosa named her the new Minister of Environment, Forestry and Fisheries.

Early life and education
Creecy is a native of Johannesburg. She attended the University of the Witwatersrand and obtained an Honours degree in Political Science. Later on, she completed a master's degree in Public Policy and Management with the University of London.

Political career
Creecy was an anti-apartheid activist and worked in the underground structures of the African National Congress whilst a student at the Witwatersrand University. She worked for the Civic Desk of the United Democratic Front and soon joined an NGO that provided training and organisational development support to trade unions and community structures. She had previously been a member of the Provincial Executive Committee of the ANC.

Creecy was one of the longest-serving Members of the Gauteng Provincial Legislature, having been elected in 1994. During her first two terms, she served as the Deputy Chief Whip as well as Chairperson of both the Social Development and Education Committees.

In 2004, Premier Mbhazima Shilowa appointed Creecy as MEC for Sports, Recreation, Arts and Culture. Paul Mashatile took over as Premier of Gauteng in 2008 and retained Creecy in her post.

In May 2009, Creecy moved to the Education portfolio and served in that post until May 2014, when Premier David Makhura selected her as the new Gauteng Finance MEC.

Following the May 2019 elections, Creecy took office as a Member of the National Assembly. The media speculated that she would be appointed to the National Finance Department, as either Minister or Deputy Minister.

Minister of Environment, Forestry and Fisheries
On 29 May 2019, President Cyril Ramaphosa appointed Creecy to the post of Minister of Environment, Forestry and Fisheries.

In November 2020, Creecy vetoed an amendment to the existing Meat Safety Act (MSA), which would have allowed the commercial sale of lion meat in South Africa.

In February 2022, Creecy announced that the trophy hunting quota for 2022 had been set for 10 black rhinos, 10 leopards and 150 elephants.

On 18 March 2022, the Pretoria High Court gave Creecy one year in which to implement the Highveld Priority Area Air Quality Management Plan that was drawn up by the government nearly a decade ago to improve air quality in South Africa's "coal belt" in Gauteng and Mpumalanga.

Creecy, along with Dan Jørgensen, led the working group at the 2022 United Nations Climate Change Conference that facilitated consultations on mitigation.

Other activities
 P4G – Partnering for Green Growth and the Global Goals 2030, Member of the Board of Directors (since 2019)

References

External links
People's Assembly profile
Barbara Creecy - 1976, being brought up by a single mother & being a career mom
BEHIND THE POLITICS: Creecy on student activism, juggling career and family life

Living people
1958 births
Members of the National Assembly of South Africa
African National Congress politicians
Women members of the National Assembly of South Africa
University of the Witwatersrand alumni
White South African anti-apartheid activists
Women government ministers of South Africa